Trimeresurus cardamomensis is a venomous pit viper species located in eastern Thailand and the Koh Kong Province in Cambodia. It is more commonly known as the Cardamom Mountains green pit viper.

References

cardamomensis